Erie High School is the sole high school in the town of Erie, Colorado. The school is a part of the St. Vrain Valley School District.

The school was formed by the separation of Erie Middle and High School. Currently there are over 1400 students attending the school. It is anticipated that each Freshman class will now enter Erie High School with around 400 students. The building was designed to honor the town of Erie's mining history, as the color scheme is of the color of coal, though the school colors are tiger orange and black. The school opened its doors in 2005 and was later expanded to accommodate enrollment growth in 2018.

Due to overcapacity, the school has put a hold on its open enrollment program. All students that aren’t in the high schools zone will be denied access.

Academics

In the fall of 2015, Erie High launched two new academic programs: the Erie Academy of Aerospace & Engineering and the AP Capstone programs. The school was one of the first high schools to be granted an AP Capstone program. It is also known for its Odyssey of the Mind program. In 2014 one team finished in 7th place in the annual World Finals in Ames, Iowa.

Steven Payne was the principal of the school from 2001 until his retirement in 2013. Matthew Buchler was the principal of the school until his retirement in 2022. Josh Griffin is now the current principal.

Athletics

Erie High School is nationally known for its softball team, which has won 12 state championships, the most all-time in Colorado high school history.

In 2021, its football team played against Chatfield High School at Empower Stadium. 

Erie High's Cheer team won state titles in 2007, 2018, 2019, 2020, 2021, and 2022.

Notable alumni

Jaccob Slavin - Defenseman for the Carolina Hurricanes of the NHL
Noah Roper - Running back for Dartmouth University’s football team

References

External links

Public high schools in Colorado
Schools in Boulder County, Colorado
Educational institutions established in 2005
2005 establishments in Colorado